Boyette is an unincorporated community and former census-designated place in Hillsborough County, Florida, United States. The population was 5,895 at the 2000 census. The CDP area merged with Riverview in 2010.

Geography
Boyette is located at  (27.842383, -82.285691).

History
Boyette was established in 1907 by Sarah (Dormany) Boyette and named for her deceased husband Samuel Thomas Boyette. This farming community once was a thriving little town that boasted a general store with a gas pump, a sawmill, a railroad depot with loading ramps for crops to be loaded, a church & cemetery, dance hall, turpentine still, and a railroad section foreman with a crew to keep the tracks fixed.

Mr. Wilson, was an early stationmaster and telegraph operator. A.T. Bennett, was the section foreman for the area of track and he and his crew of workers kept the railroad track in good working order. The area where they lived was called the "section houses". This was a rough area and there were shootings and stabbings nearly every weekend. Occasionally moonshine stills would be brought out of the swamp and were busted by the authorities.

Founding families included the Simmons, Hobsons, Sumners, Wilsons, and of course Boyettes. The town died when the railroad was removed and all the residents either died or moved away. The Boyette family; however, remained maintaining a relatively lucrative farming business. Their descendants still maintain a small portion of the former estate today. There are only two historical remains of Boyette. One is the old cemetery, which is still there but has not been found in years; it exists somewhere in a nearby pasture. There is no other structure that dates back to the time.

Demographics
As of the census of 2000, there were 5,895 people, 1,937 households, and 1,638 families residing in the community. The racial makeup of the community was 88.46% White, 5.39% African American, 0.63% Native American, 1.51% Asian, 0.07% Pacific Islander, 1.71% from other races, and 2.22% from two or more races. Hispanic or Latino of any race were 8.16% of the population.

There were 1,937 households, out of which 46.8% had children under the age of 18 living with them, 72.1% were married couples living together, 8.6% had a female householder with no husband present, and 15.4% were non-families. 11.2% of all households were made up of individuals, and 3.3% had someone living alone who was 65 years of age or older.  The average household size was 3.04 and the average family size was 3.29.

In the community, the population was spread out, with 31.7% under the age of 18, 5.7% from 18 to 24, 32.9% from 25 to 44, 23.0% from 45 to 64, and 6.8% who were 65 years of age or older.  The median age was 36 years. For every 100 females, there were 101.1 males.  For every 100 females age 18 and over, there were 97.0 males.

The median income for a household in the community was $55,133, and the median income for a family was $56,818. Males had a median income of $41,446 versus $30,781 for females. The per capita income for the community was $21,057.  About 5.5% of families and 5.9% of the population were below the poverty line, including 5.4% of those under age 18 and 6.8% of those age 65 or over.

References

Former census-designated places in Hillsborough County, Florida
Unincorporated communities in Hillsborough County, Florida
Unincorporated communities in Florida
Former census-designated places in Florida
1907 establishments in Florida